Meng Haoran (689/691–740) was a major Tang dynasty poet, and a somewhat older contemporary of Wang Wei, Li Bai and Du Fu. Despite his brief pursuit of an official career, Meng Haoran mainly lived in and wrote about the area in which he was born and raised, in what is now Hubei province, China. Meng Haoran was a major influence on other contemporary and subsequent poets of the High Tang era because of his focus on nature as a main topic for poetry. Meng Haoran was also prominently featured in the Qing dynasty (and subsequently frequently republished) poetry anthology Three Hundred Tang Poems, having the fifth largest number of his poems included, for a total of fifteen, exceeded only by Du Fu, Li Bai, Wang Wei, and Li Shangyin. These poems of Meng Haoran were available in the English translations by Witter Bynner and Kiang Kanghu, by 1920, with the publication of The Jade Mountain. The Three Hundred Tang Poems also has two poems by Li Bai addressed to Meng Haoran, one in his praise and one written in farewell on the occasion of their parting company. Meng Haoran was also influential to Japanese poetry.

Biography

First of the major High Tang poets, Meng Haoran was born in Xiangyang District, Xiangfan, south of the Han River, in the modern province of Hubei. He remained strongly attached to this area and its scenery throughout his life. He had a rather abbreviated civil service career, passing the Jinshi civil service test, beginning at the late age of 39 and ending not much later. As recorded by the New Book of Tang, he was recommended by his good friend Wang Wei, and Emperor Xuanzong granted him an audience during which he recited his poetry. However, one line therein angered the emperor: "The untalented the wise lord discards", which Xuanzong interpreted as a sarcastic complaint for not employing him sooner in the imperial government. Thus, he was sent away from the palace. He received his only position three years before his death but resigned after less than a year. He lived in the Xiangyang area almost all his life (although he traveled to the major metropolis of Chang'an, where he was hosted by Wang Wei in 728). The landscape, history and legends of his home area are the subjects of many poems. Particularly prominent are Nanshan (or South Mountain, his family seat) and Lumen Shan, a temple site, where he briefly lived in retreat.

Works
Meng Haoran is often bracketed with Wang Wei, due to the friendship they shared and their prominence as landscape poets. In fact, Haoran composed several poems about Wei and their separation.  While Wei focused on the natural world, in particular the solitude and reprieve it granted from human life along with the scale of the natural world, Meng Haoran focuses more on foreground details and human life, such as returning villagers waiting at the ferry crossing, fishermen, or (often unseen) mountain hermits dwelling in religious seclusion. His works are generally considered less consistently successful than Wang's; however, the themes and styles of Meng Haoran's poetry helped to set a convention followed by younger poets, such as Wang Wei.

In contemporary mainland China, Meng's poem Spring Morning is probably one of the best known poems from the Tang dynasty, as it has appeared in the widely used first grade level Chinese language textbook published by the People's Education Press since the 1980s and serves as the first exposure to Literary Chinese for hundreds of millions of students.

See also
Classical Chinese poetry
Meng Jiao
Tang poetry
Wang Wei
Chinese Wikipedia article on relationship to Mencius (孟家) (In Chinese)

References

  Contains English translations of all known poems by Meng Haoran.
Nienhauser, William H (ed.). The Indiana Companion to Traditional Chinese Literature.  Indiana University Press 1986. 
Ma Maoyuan, "Meng Haoran". Encyclopedia of China (Chinese Literature Edition), 1st ed.

Further reading
 Kroll, Paul W. (2021). The Poetry of Meng Haoran . De Gruyter Mouton.

External links
 
 Five-character regulated verses of Meng Haoran, with English translation, pinyin transliteration, and tonal patterns.
 
 

Three Hundred Tang Poems poets
7th-century births
740 deaths
People from Xiangyang
Poets from Hubei
8th-century Chinese poets